Henri Emmanuelli (31 May 1945 – 21 March 2017) was a French politician. A member of the French Socialist Party, he was deputy for Landes from 1978 to 1981, from 1986 to 1997, and from 2000 to 2017.

Early life and career 
Emmanuelli was born in Eaux-Bonnes in the French department of Pyrénées-Atlantiques. He grew up with a working-class background and lost his father at a very young age. He studied at Lycée Louis-Barthou in Pau, Pyrénées-Atlantiques and then in Sciences Po in Paris.

In 1969, he joined the Compagnie Financière Edmond de Rothschild. In 1971, he was appointed to the management of this company, becoming a senior banking executive and then a co-director in 1975. He continued his professional career at the Rothschild Bank until he was elected at the French National Assembly at age 32 in 1978.

Political career 
He joined the Socialist Party in 1971. On the request of François Mitterrand he was, at the age of 27, a candidate in the legislative elections of March 1973 in the second circonscription of Lot-et-Garonne. But it was on 19 March 1978 that he was elected for the first time as the deputy for the third electoral district of Landes, which moved the district to the left-wing. In 1982, he was elected for the first time as the President of the General Council of Landes. Between 1981 and 1986, he served in the governments of Pierre Mauroy and Laurent Fabius as the Secretary of State charged with the DOM-TOM territories of France and between 1981 and 1983, as Secretary of State for Budget between 1983 and 1986, and Secretary of State for Consumption between 1984 and 1986.

Between January 1992 and April 1993, he was chairman of the National Assembly. He was then elected First Secretary of the Socialist Party in June 1994 and held this office until October 1995. His election to this position was seen as revenge for the Mitterrand wing of the Socialist Party against Michel Rocard, the incumbent First Secretary, who had been weakened by the party's poor result in the 1994 European Parliament election. However, he was defeated by Lionel Jospin in the race to represent the Socialist Party in the 1995 presidential election. Jospin also took on the role of First Secretary of the party in October 1995. One year later, Emmanuelli was convicted for the illicit financing of the party when he was its treasurer. He re-entered politics in 2000.

Whilst he was a faithful supporter of Mitterrand until the latter's death, he is identified as belonging to the left-wing of the Socialist Party, and was one of the leaders of the party's "New World" faction formed in 2002 that aimed to steer the party leftwards after Jospin's poor performance in that year's presidential election. In the campaigns for the Referendum on the European Constitution in 2005 and the Treaty of Rome of 2004, he publicly declared himself in favour of the no campaign; this put him in direct opposition to the official line of the Socialist Party, which was in favour of the treaty. He believed that the treaty was a move away from the idea of a Federal Europe, which he endorsed, notably in his "Plea for Europe". He is followed by his close supporters, one of which is Michel Vergnier, the deputy for la Creuse. In 2000, he took part in the Congress of Grenoble of the Socialist Party and was an avid campaigner for a Socialist Party that was aligned to the left. For the Congress of Mans in November 2005, he associated himself with the New Socialist Party motion of Arnaud Montebourg, Vincent Peillon, and Benoît Hamon.

Political career

Governmental functions
Secretary of State for Overseas Territories: 1981–1983
Secretary of State for Budget and consommation: 1983–1986

Electoral mandates

National Assembly of France
President of the National Assembly of France: 1992–1993
Member of the National Assembly of France for Landes (3rd constituency): 1978–1981 (Became secretary of State in 1981) / 1986–1997 (Sentenced to prison in 1997) / Since 2000. Elected in 1978, reelected in 1981, 1986, 1988, 1993, 1997, 2000, 2002, 2007, 2012.

Regional Council
Regional councillor of Aquitaine: 1986–1988 (resignation)

General Council
President of the General Council of Landes: 1982–1997 (Sentenced to prison in 1997) / Since 2000. Reelected in 1985, 1988, 1992, 1994, 2001, 2004, 2008, 2011.
General councillor of Landes, elected in the canton of Tartas-Ouest, them from 1994 for the canton of Mugron: 1982–1997 (Sentenced to prison in 1997) / Since 2000. Reelected in 1988, 1994, 2000, 2001, 2008.

Political functions
First Secretary (leader) of the Socialist Party: 1994–1995, elected in 1994.

Death
Emmanuelli died on 21 March 2017 at a medical center in Bayonne, Pyrénées-Atlantiques from complications of acute bronchitis at the age of 71.

Publications 

 Plaidoyer pour l’Europe, Éditions Flammarion, July 1992. (A Plea for Europe)
 Citadelles interdites, Éditions Ramsay, 2000 (roman). (Forbidden Citadels)

References

External links
 

1945 births
2017 deaths
Infectious disease deaths in France
People from Béarn
Chairmen of the Socialist Party (France)
Politicians of the French Fifth Republic
French Ministers of Budget
French Ministers of Overseas France
French people of Corsican descent
French bankers
Socialist Party (France) politicians
Sciences Po alumni
Presidents of the National Assembly (France)
Deputies of the 12th National Assembly of the French Fifth Republic
Deputies of the 13th National Assembly of the French Fifth Republic
Deputies of the 14th National Assembly of the French Fifth Republic
Politicians from Nouvelle-Aquitaine